The 2005 Southeastern Conference baseball tournament was held at Hoover Metropolitan Stadium in Hoover, Alabama from May 25 through 29.  Mississippi State won the tournament and earned the Southeastern Conference's automatic bid to the 2005 NCAA Tournament.

Regular Season Results

Tournament

Vanderbilt, Auburn, Georgia and Kentucky did not make the tournament.

All-Tournament Team

See also
College World Series
NCAA Division I Baseball Championship
Southeastern Conference baseball tournament

References

SECSports.com All-Time Baseball Tournament Results
Boydsworld 2005 Standings
SECSports.com All-Tourney Team Lists

Tournament
Southeastern Conference Baseball Tournament
Southeastern Conference baseball tournament
Southeastern Conference baseball tournament
College sports tournaments in Alabama
Baseball competitions in Hoover, Alabama